Zhiping She Ethnic Township is an ethnic township for She people in Ninghua County, Fujian, China. , it has 12 villages under its administration:
Zhiping She Ethnic Village
Dengwu Village
Pengfang Village
Hubeijiao She Ethnic Village
Shefu She Ethnic Village
Pingpu She Ethnic Village
Nikeng She Ethnic Village
Gaodi She Ethnic Village
Xiaping She Ethnic Village
Gaofeng She Ethnic Village
Tian She Ethnic Village
Guangliang She Ethnic Village

References 

Township-level divisions of Fujian
Ninghua County
She ethnic townships